Scylla paramamosain is a mud crab commonly consumed in Southeast Asia.

Distribution

Scylla paramamosain is found along the coastlines of the South China Sea down to the Java Sea. It is now produced by aquaculture farms in southern Vietnam.

Taxonomy
Scylla paramamosain was described by Eulogio P. Estampador in 1949, as a subspecies of Scylla serrata. It is now known that the crabs previously referred to as S. serrata in China were mostly S. paramamosain.

References

Arthropods of Vietnam
Edible crustaceans
Commercial crustaceans
Portunoidea
Crustaceans described in 1949